The men's individual table tennis – Class 11 tournament at the 2016 Summer Paralympics in Rio de Janeiro took place during 8–12 September 2016 at Riocentro Pavilion 3. This class was for athletes with intellectual impairment.

In the preliminary stage, athletes competed in four groups. Winners and runners-up of each group qualified for the quarterfinals.

Results
All times are local time in UTC-3.

Finals

Main bracket

Bronze-medal match

Preliminary round

Group A

8 September, 17:40

9 September, 15:00

10 September, 12:00

Group B

8 September, 17:40

9 September, 15:00

10 September, 12:00

Group C

8 September, 18:20

9 September, 15:00

10 September, 12:00

Group D

9 September, 15:00

References

MI11